The War Back Home is the fourth studio album of  The Ducky Boys. It was recorded and released in 2006. The album was a total band collaboration with lyrics written by both bassist Mark Lind and guitarist Douglas Sullivan. This is the Ducky Boy's first album on the label of Sailor's Grave Records..

Track listing
 "Celebrate" – 2:45
 "The Middle Children of History" – 2:18
 "Tortured Soul" - 2:35
 "Isolation" – 2:39
 "Kids" – 2:29
 "Two Thieves and a Savior" – 2:24
 "City Girl" – 2:30
 "Bombs Away" – 3:13
 "Corporate America" – 2:54
 "Outlaw" - 3:40
 "This Time Last Year" – 2:53
 "Contrived and Treacherous" – 2:00

Band members
 Mark Lind - vocals, bass
 Douglas Sullivan - guitar, vocals
 Jason Messina - drums

2006 albums
The Ducky Boys albums